Isopachys is a genus of skinks endemic to Asia.

Geographic range
Species in the genus Isopachys are found in Thailand and Myanmar.

Species
There are four species in this genus:
Isopachys anguinoides  - Thai snake skink, Heyer's isopachys
Isopachys borealis  - Lang's isopachys
Isopachys gyldenstolpei  - Gyldenstolpe's worm skink, Gyldenstolpe's isopachys, Gyldenstolpe's snake skink
Isopachys roulei  - Chonburi snake skink

Nota bene: A binomial authority in parentheses indicates that the species was originally described in a genus other than Isopachys.

References

Further reading
Lönnberg E (1916). "Zoological Results of the Swedish Zoological Expedition to Siam 1911-1912 and 1914: 2. Lizards". Kungliga Svenska Vetenskapsakademiens Handlingar 55 (4): 1–12. (Isopachys, new genus, p. 10).

 
Reptiles of Southeast Asia
Lizard genera
Taxa named by Einar Lönnberg